Sequoyah High School is a public high school founded in 1908 located in Claremore, Oklahoma.
The school colors are blue and gold, and the mascot is an eagle.

History 
In 1908, the first graduating class left a two-story schoolhouse that was located on the current site.  In 1936 an indoor gymnasium and high school building were added.

In 1957 the gym and high school burned to the ground but were rebuilt by 1959.  Another fire destroyed the elementary building in 1975.  A new elementary school was built.

The next 15 years saw a new middle school, football program, band program, track, and the Olan Graham field house that is still used today.

Every five years patrons have supported bond issues and added land, buildings, and programs.

In 2006, the Eagles won the 2006 State Football Championship with a record of 14–0.

Notable alumni
Levy Adcock, American football player
Tim Martin, American football player

References

External links
Sequoyah Eagles web site

Public high schools in Oklahoma
Schools in Rogers County, Oklahoma